Ulrick Tremayne John Jr. (born May 20, 1992) is a former American football offensive tackle. He played college football at Georgia State, and was drafted by the Indianapolis Colts in the seventh round of the 2014 NFL Draft. He has also played for the Miami Dolphins, Arizona Cardinals, Green Bay Packers, New England Patriots, and New Orleans Saints.

College career
John played in four games off the bench as a freshman in Georgia State's inaugural season. In 2011, he played in 10 games, starting four, including starts at left tackle, center, and left guard. John started 10 games at left tackle in 2012 and started 11 games at left tackle in 2013. He was an All-Sun Belt honorable mention in 2013.

Professional career

Indianapolis Colts
During the 2014 NFL Draft, John was selected in the seventh round, 232nd overall, by the Indianapolis Colts. He was placed on injured reserve on August 26 with a right leg injury. On September 5, 2015, John was waived. He was signed to the practice squad the next day.

Miami Dolphins
On October 31, 2015, John was signed by the Miami Dolphins off the Colts practice squad.

John was released by the Dolphins during final roster cuts and was signed to the Dolphins' practice squad on September 4, 2016.

Arizona Cardinals
On October 8, 2016, John was signed by the Arizona Cardinals off the Dolphins' practice squad. He was placed on injured reserve on December 13, 2016 with a shoulder injury.

On September 12, 2017, John was released by the Cardinals and was re-signed to the practice squad.

Green Bay Packers
On September 26, 2017, John was signed by the Green Bay Packers off the Cardinals' practice squad.

New England Patriots
On April 23, 2018, John signed with the New England Patriots. On September 1, John was placed on injured reserve. The Patriots reached Super Bowl LIII where they defeated the Los Angeles Rams, making John the first player from Georgia State to be on a Super Bowl-winning team.

New Orleans Saints
On May 13, 2019, John signed with the New Orleans Saints. He was placed on injured reserve on August 10, 2019. He was released on August 15 with an injury settlement.

References

External links
 New England Patriots bio
Green Bay Packers bio
Georgia State Panthers bio

1992 births
Living people
People from Hinesville, Georgia
Players of American football from Georgia (U.S. state)
American football offensive tackles
Georgia State Panthers football players
Indianapolis Colts players
Miami Dolphins players
Arizona Cardinals players
Green Bay Packers players
New England Patriots players
New Orleans Saints players